MediaCityUK tram stop is a stop on the Manchester Metrolink light rail system. It is located in MediaCityUK, in Salford. The stop serves MediaCityUK, The Lowry, the Imperial War Museum North and other parts of Salford Quays. It is at the end of a short spur from the Eccles Line.

History

MediaCityUK is a development within Salford Quays, on the site of the former Manchester Docks. When an active port, the quays were served by numerous railway goods lines.

The Metrolink's extension into Salford Quays was part of a programme of urban renewal for the area around the Manchester Ship Canal. Plans for a light rail system into Salford Quays have existed since around 1987, initially as far as Broadway; the proposals evolved, with plans for a branch line to serve the Lowry arts centre. The MediaCity extension replaced that proposal. It opened on 20 September 2010, as the terminus of a specially-constructed  from the Eccles Line.

Services to the station were suspended following an incident at the Harbour City crossover on the second day of operation. A driver reversed after only partially passing over spring-loaded points causing the tram to straddle two tracks and hit a central support column.

Services

Service pattern
12 minutes service to Ashton-under-Lyne
12 minutes service to Eccles (before 07:00 and after 20:00 Mon-Fri; Before 09:00 and after 18:30 Saturdays; all day Sundays and Bank Holidays)

The station was originally served by a dedicated Piccadilly - MediaCityUK service during enhanced service (07:00-20:00 Mon-Fri; 09:00-18:30 Sat). However, as of 28 January 2018, services were extended to operate between MediaCityUK and Etihad Campus during enhanced service every 12 minutes, with Eccles - Ashton services calling outside of these times. The Etihad Campus service was further extended to Ashton in January 2019 meaning a through service between MediaCityUK and Ashton during all hours of operation.

Connecting bus routes
MediaCityUK tram stop is served nearby by Diamond Bus North West services 29, 73 and 79, Go North West Orbits 53, travelling between Cheetham Hill and Salford Shopping Centre and Stagecoach Manchester service 50, linking Salford Shopping Centre in Pendleton, Salford Crescent railway station, Salford University, Salford Central railway station, Manchester and East Didsbury with Salford Quays and MediaCityUK.

References

External links

MediaCityUK Stop Information
MediaCityUK area map

Railway stations opened in 2010
Tram stops in Salford
Tram stops on the Eccles to Piccadilly line
Tram stops on the MediaCityUK to Cornbrook line
Salford Quays